Ammachiveedu Muhurthi is a Hindu temple located in the Kollam district of the state of Kerala, India. It is estimated to be around 600 years old, and holds an annual 10-day celebration during the Dhanu festival.

History
Although there are no historical records of the early history of the temple, it is thought to have been founded around 600 years ago by the Ammachi Veedu family ("Ammachi Veedu" means "Ammachi home"), aristocrats from Kollam.

Structure

The Ammachiveedu Muhurthi's Garbhagriha is small, measuring only 4 feet by 4 feet, by 6 feet tall.
The temple has a Peedam (small platform), clad with silver plate, upon which the deity stands. Two Shankha, in golden covers, are placed over the Peedam.

The temple has a number of other deities seated outside, including Ganesha, Rektha Chamundi, Paramparu, Ykshi, Marutha, Rekshas, Gandharvan, Vethalam, and Yogeshwaran. Another deity, Djinn, is placed outside the temple premises and is worshipped by the Muslim community.

Adjoining the temple there is a Sarpakavu, or snake grove, which houses images of Parappooramma Bhagavathi, Nagaraja, Nagayakshi, and Naga Kanyaka.

Dedication

The Ammachiveedu Muhurthi temple has no main idol, and is dedicated to the guru (teacher) of the Dharmaśāstra, of the Shasthamkotta temple, about 35 km away.

The deity was entrusted to the elders of the Ammachi Veedu family as a recognition of the marriage ceremonies carried out at the temple, and they are now also revered as "Brahma Rakshas" on the right hand of the deity. Because the deity of the temple has the status of a guru, members of the family are prohibited from entering the premises of the Shasthamkotta temple.

The Ammachiveedu Muhurthi temple has no caste bar, and is used by worshippers of various castes and creeds. ‘Ginnu’ (Jinn), a supernatural being in Arab folklore and Islamic teachings, is one of the sub-deities here at Ammachiveedu Muhurthi temple along with the Hindu sub-deities like Raktha Chamundi, Ganapathy, Marutha etc.

Festivals and Ceremonies

Various pujas (ceremonies, or festivals) are performed at the Ammachiveedu Muhurthi temple, at auspicious times.

The ceremonies of Sarpa Bali (sacrifice for snakes) and Noorum Palum (making offerings to snakes) are conducted by the priest from the Pampummekkattu Mana, in Mala, in the Thrissur district.

The temple's main annual festival has no specific date, but falls during Dhanu, which runs from mid-December to early January, and is always held after the Mandala Puja at the Sabarimala Dharma Shastra temple. By an agreement, members of Ammachiveedu must not make a pilgrimage to Sabarimala.

On the 10th day the Karanavan (the eldest male in the family) conducts the puja in the Kalam specially prepared for the purpose, when boiled Ninam is offered to the deity.

See also
 List of Hindu temples in Kerala
 Temples of Kerala

References

Hindu temples in Kollam district